Gorai Union is a union of Mirzapur Upazila, Tangail District, Bangladesh.

Demographics
According to the 2011 Bangladesh census, Gorai Union had 14,397 households and a population of 57,897. The literacy rate (age 7 and over) was 59.4% (male: 64.1%, female: 54.8%).

See also
 Union Councils of Tangail District

References

Populated places in Tangail District
Unions of Mirzapur Upazila